Atrai may be refer to:

 Atrai River, a trans-boundary river between Bangladesh and India
 Atrai Upazila, a upazila of Naogaon District, Bangladesh
 Daihatsu Atrai, the minivan version and also a flagship model of Daihatsu Hijet
 CGS Atrai, a Pabna Class riverine patrol crafts of Bangladesh Coast Guard
 Hatra, ancient city